Sir William Grant (13 October 1752 – 23 May 1832) was a British lawyer, Member of Parliament from 1790–1812 and Master of the Rolls from 1801–1817.

He was born at Elchies, Moray, Scotland. His father, James Grant, was a tenant farmer, later collector of the customs in the Isle of Man; after the death of his parents, Grant was raised by his uncle Robert Grant, a London merchant with fur-trading interests in Canada. Grant studied at King's College, University of Aberdeen, at the University of Leiden and then studied law at Lincoln's Inn. He was called to the bar in 1774. Grant arrived at the town of Quebec in 1775 and took part in its defence against the Americans. In 1776, he was appointed attorney general for the province. However, Lord George Germain, secretary of state for the American colonies, chose James Monk for the post. In the meantime, Grant had issued ordinances establishing civil and criminal courts in Quebec. He returned to Britain in 1778.

Grant's legal career after his return was initially quite unsuccessful, and he contemplated returning to Canada. However, on the advice of Lord Thurlow, he turned with better success to the equity courts. An interview with Pitt encouraged his Parliamentary ambitions, and he was returned as Member of Parliament for Shaftesbury in 1790. Grant proved to be a powerful orator, giving a lucid explanation of Canadian law during the debates over the Quebec Government Bill.

He received a patent of precedence in 1793, was made a bencher of Lincoln's Inn, and was appointed a Welsh justice for the Carmarthen great sessions. However, he was not returned for Shaftesbury at the by-election triggered by his appointment, returning to Parliament only in February 1794 for Windsor after a strenuously-fought contest. In March, he was appointed Solicitor-General to Queen Charlotte. His oratorical reputation was renewed the following year with a defence of the Seditious Meetings Act 1795.

In 1796, Grant was returned for Banffshire, which he continued to represent until 1812. He was appointed Chief Justice of Chester in 1798, and the following year was made Solicitor General and knighted. Grant left office with Pitt, but under Addington, was made Master of the Rolls and sworn of the Privy Council on 21 May 1801. He continued to support Addington and the second Pitt ministry in debate in the House of Commons; his defence of Melville in 1805 brought him into conflict with Grenville when he came to power.

Grant declined an offer of the Chancellorship of Ireland in 1807 from the Duke of Portland, but supported the Portland and Perceval ministries. He left office as Master of the Rolls in 1817, but continued for several years to hear appeals to the Privy Council at the cockpit. Among other honours, Grant served as treasurer of Lincoln's Inn in 1798, rector of the University of Aberdeen from 1809, and was awarded a DCL by the University of Oxford in 1820.

On 24 June 1824, he was appointed to the Royal Commission for inquiring into the nature and extent of the Instruction afforded by the several Institutions in Ireland established for the purpose of Education where he served with the other Commissioners: Thomas Frankland Lewis, John Leslie Foster, James Glassford and Anthony Richard Blake.

Grant died at his sister's house Dawlish, Devon, England on 25 May 1832. He was remembered both for the excellence and persuasiveness of his Parliamentary oration, as well as for eloquence and exposition during his judicial career.

References

External links

Biography at the Dictionary of Canadian Biography Online

1752 births
1832 deaths
Knights Bachelor
Members of Lincoln's Inn
Members of the Parliament of Great Britain for English constituencies
Members of the Parliament of Great Britain for Scottish constituencies
Members of the Privy Council of the United Kingdom
Members of the Parliament of the United Kingdom for Scottish constituencies
People from Moray
Scottish expatriates in Canada
Solicitors General for England and Wales
UK MPs 1801–1802
UK MPs 1802–1806
UK MPs 1806–1807
UK MPs 1807–1812
Whig (British political party) MPs
Alumni of the University of Aberdeen
Masters of the Rolls
British MPs 1790–1796
British MPs 1796–1800
Rectors of the University of Aberdeen